Brąswałd  is a village in the administrative district of Gmina Dywity, within Olsztyn County, Warmian-Masurian Voivodeship, in northern Poland. It is located in Warmia.

Notable people
  (1856–1928), Polish priest, activist and historian
  (1894–1984), Polish poet, teacher, activist, prisoner of the Ravensbrück concentration camp

References

Villages in Olsztyn County